Blaž Kavčič was the defending champion, but did not compete this year.

Dudi Sela won the title after defeating Wu Di 6–4, 6–3 in the final.

Seeds

Draw

Finals

Top half

Bottom half

References
Main Draw
Qualifying Draw

Gemdale ATP Challenger - Singles
Pingshan Open